Jerry Rosario (born 2 October 1952) is an Indian Jesuit priest (from the Tamil Nadu area), a theologian, a pastor, spiritual counselor, a writer, a social activist, a motivator, a civil lawyer, a retreat- facilitator. And also,  founder-director of four movements   (DHAANAM for human donations, JEPASA for socio-pastoral animation, IGFA for Ignatian spirituality, and MANITHAM for political analysis and action)

He has completed a Bachelor of Science (B.Sc.) in Rural Development Science, an MA in Political Science, Bachelor of Laws (LLB) in Bangalore, PhD in Political Philosophy with Theology. He is a faculty-member of the Dhyana Ashram, Chennai.

Socio-Pastoral Activities
Rosario has done 23 years of insertional and involved services among the dalits, rural and slum poor.  He has a doctorate in political theology. Other studies and searches have made him a pastor, professor, motivator, spiritual counselor, social analyst, writer and retreat facilitator.  He is also a civil lawyer.

He is well known to many as "barefoot priest," because he has given up wearing footwear in solidarity with those dalits and poorest who are deprived the right to wear it by caste-ridden traditions. He is a visiting professor in 42 institutions and has lectured in 38 countries so far.

Periyarism
Fr. Jerry Rosario has a doctorate in Periyarism.  The philosophy of Thanthai E.V.Ramaswamy Periyar, who undertook a political analysis of Hinduism, Buddhism, Islam and Christianity, and had birthed a "Self-respect movement" in Tamil Nadu and in other parts of South India. '

Author
Books authored by Fr. Jerry Rosario have been published through Vaigarai Publications and other publishing houses. Dr. Jerry has so far authored 88 books, of which 26 books are in English and 62 are in Tamil. Seventeen of his books have become textbooks for  Students of various autonomous colleges and universities. To date, nine students have completed their M.Phil researches based on Dr.Jerry’s thoughts and defended their theses in various secular universities. Three have gone ahead with doctorate research on Dr. Jerry's books. Of them, Dr. Sr. Selestin Mary, CTC, had completed and published her Ph.D. research on "The Societal Analysis of Contemporary World highlighted in the forty-five Tamil books of Dr.Jerry ".

Dr. Jerry is also Founder of movements which are JEPASA (Jesuit Pastors of South Asia), for socio-pastoral animation; DHANAM, for human organ donations; MANITHAM, for political analysis and action; and IGFA (Ignatian Family), for cosmic Ignatian spirituality.

He has donated his O-Rh Negative Blood 207 times as of March 2021. He ranks first among the highest number of blood donors in India. He has also signed relevant documents, civilly known as the 'Living Will', expressing his will to donate his vital organs and body after his death to the needy and also for medical research. He incidentally authored a book named Dhaanam in Tamil.  This book explains different type of human donations, i.e., blood donation, eye donation, stem cell donation, bone and tissue donation, body donation, organ donation. Its English version is titled A Present for the Future. A website, http://www.dhanam.org/, by the Dhaanam movement dedicated to the promotion of human donations has been operated from 2016.

References

1952 births
20th-century Indian Jesuits
Living people
20th-century Indian Roman Catholic theologians
Indian political philosophers
Indian religious writers
Writers from Tamil Nadu
21st-century Indian Roman Catholic theologians
21st-century Indian Jesuits